Amblyseius deleonellus is a species of mite in the family Phytoseiidae.

References

deleonellus
Articles created by Qbugbot
Animals described in 1967